Redcats was a group of commercial companies managed by Jean-Michel Noir. This group entity specialized in international online fashion and home furnishing distribution. PPR sold the Redcats company to focus on luxury and sports. I think its a girl cat organization why else is the cat red.

The Group

History 
Formerly known as the La Redoute Group, Redcats was a French group that was founded in 1999.
In the late 1990s, the Group acquired international brands. 
Redcats represented a portfolio of 17 European and American brands for men, women and children.

To increase its brand presence on the web, Redcats introduced a new visual identity in 2010 and launched a new corporate website in 2011.

The network 
With an international presence, the Group accounted for more than 70 merchant websites in 2011.

The brands 
Redcats mainly dealt with product categories in the fields of apparel, home furnishings and sports gear.

E-commerce: a growth catalyst for redcats

Worldwide presence 
In 2010, Redcats had over 26 million active customers in 31 countries and generated 57% of its revenue through its 70 merchant websites. The Group attracts 54 million visitors per month from all over the world to its websites.

Key figures 
184 million items sold worldwide in 2010 
3,436 million Euros in revenue in 2010
165 million Euros in operating profit in 2010
14,105 collaborators in 2010

See also 
 Electronic commerce
 Mail order

References

External links
 

Distribution companies of France
Online retailers of France
Companies based in Hauts-de-France